Manuela Manja Groß (later Leupold, born 29 January 1957 in East Berlin, East Germany) is a German former competitive pair skater. With partner Uwe Kagelmann, she is a two-time Olympic bronze medalist, and she is the youngest female figure skating Olympic medalist. She turned 15 just four days before the opening of the 1972 Winter Olympics, held in Sapporo, Japan, where she won her first bronze medal in pairs skating.

Groß began figure skating in Berlin. She was paired with Uwe Kagelmann. They skated for the SC Dynamo Berlin club representing East Germany. Their coach was Heinz-Friedrich Lindner.

Groß became a figure skating coach at the SC Berlin club and coaches many recreational figure skaters.

Results 
pairs with Kagelmann

See also 
 World Figure Skating Championships

External links 
 https://web.archive.org/web/20060502042510/http://www.eklscberlin.arcgraph.de/

1957 births
Living people
People from East Berlin
Figure skaters from Berlin
German female pair skaters
Figure skaters at the 1972 Winter Olympics
Figure skaters at the 1976 Winter Olympics
Olympic figure skaters of East Germany
Olympic bronze medalists for East Germany
Olympic medalists in figure skating
World Figure Skating Championships medalists
European Figure Skating Championships medalists
Medalists at the 1976 Winter Olympics
Medalists at the 1972 Winter Olympics
Recipients of the Patriotic Order of Merit in bronze
20th-century German women